Fraternitas (minor planet designation: 309 Fraternitas) is a typical Main belt asteroid. It was discovered by Johann Palisa on 6 April 1891 in Vienna.

References

External links 
 
 

000309
Discoveries by Johann Palisa
Named minor planets
18910406